Ballast Point Park is a park located within the Ballast Point neighborhood in Tampa, Florida. The park is adjacent to the Hillsborough Bay.

History
Ballast Point Park was formerly named Jules Verne Park and had its beginnings in the 1800s. The historical marker placed at the park by the Hillsborough County Historical Commission reads:

Features
The sections of the park that are open from sunrise to sunset include the playground, water play area and shelters for picnics and parties. The park also contains an interactive water play area for children. There is a  pier in the park that is open 24 hours. There is also a small, informal concession at the pier, Taste of Boston, which serves seafood, ice cream and American food.

References

 
 

Parks in Tampa, Florida
Buildings and structures in Tampa, Florida